VG247 is a video game blog published in the United Kingdom, founded in February 2008 by industry veteran Patrick Garratt. In 2009, CNET ranked it as the third best gaming blog in the world.

History 
Founded in collaboration on 1 February 2008 between games journalist Patrick Garratt and Eurogamer Network, VG247 was set up to be a news-only blog, the first of its kind in the UK to have a specialist games blog found among the likes of American sites Kotaku and Joystiq. At launch, VG247 did not review video games and focused instead on news, interviews, and previews. Garratt was the only staff member at the time of launch, although grew in time with the addition of contributors Mike Bowden and Nathan Grayson.

In early 2009, the site relaunched itself, rebranding from videogaming247.com to VG247; at the same time the site changed its primary url to www.vg247.com, and launched a new site design, with improved features, and staff. The site added additional staff over the next year.

VG247 began to create original video content in 2012 and had some staff changes. Matt Martin became the site's editor-in-chief and website founder Patrick Garratt moved into a full-time publisher role in 2014; in the same period the website launched its third design iteration. The site launched an Italian edition in March.

In October 2015, VG247 pulled their preview of Uncharted 4: A Thief's End and issued an apology after being contacted by Sony that the game they had played was Uncharted 2: Among Thieves from the remastered Uncharted: The Nathan Drake Collection.

Starting in September 2019, the site started to add reviews for recent games, using a 5-star ratings system.

Awards 
VG247 has been nominated twice for Best Website and Best Online Blog at the Games Media Awards in 2008 and 2009. While it did not win either award in 2008,  in 2009 it won Best Online Blog, with Garratt winning Best Specialist Online Writer.  Garratt was awarded three Games Media Legend awards in 2009.

The site was nominated for the Best Online Blog award at the 2010 Games Media Awards, but lost to Rock Paper Shotgun. The site was nominated again for the Best Online Blog at the 2011 Games Media Awards.

References

External links 
 

British entertainment websites
Video game blogs
Internet properties established in 2008